What's Your Favorite Color? is a compilation album by hard rock band Living Colour. It was released in 2005.

Track listing

Personnel
 Corey Glover – vocals
 Vernon Reid – guitar
 Muzz Skillings – bass
 Doug Wimbish – bass
 Will Calhoun – drums

Living Colour albums
2005 compilation albums